Burris Fork Township is an inactive township in Moniteau County, in the U.S. state of Missouri.

Burris Fork Township takes its name from Burris Fork creek.

References

Townships in Missouri
Townships in Moniteau County, Missouri
Jefferson City metropolitan area